Evocation II: Pantheon is the seventh studio album by Swiss folk metal band Eluveitie. The album was released on 18 August 2017 through Nuclear Blast. It was the first album to include Matteo Sisti, Michalina Malisz, Alain Ackermann, Jonas Wolf and Fabienne Erni as band members.

Track listing

Personnel

Eluveitie
 Chrigel Glanzmann – vocals, mandola, whistles
 Fabienne Erni – vocals, celtic harp
 Matteo Sisti – bagpipes, uilleann pipes, whistles, bodhrán
 Michalina Malisz – hurdy-gurdy
 Nicole Ansperger – fiddles, vocals on track 4
 Kay Brem – bass guitar
 Jonas Wolf – acoustic guitars, resonator guitars
 Rafael Salzmann – acoustic guitars
 Alain Ackermann – drums, percussion

Guests musicians
 Oliver s. Tyr – nyckelharpa, irish bouzouki on track 2 & 8
 Brendan Wade – uilleann pipes on track 7 & 12
 Netta Skog – accordion on track 6

Choirs in track 1 & 9 by Chrigel Glanzmann, Jonas Wolf, Kay Brem & Fabienne Erni

Linguistic consulting by Edward Hatfield

Charts

References

2017 albums
Eluveitie albums
Nuclear Blast albums